Syrdariya is a district of Kyzylorda Region in southern Kazakhstan. The administrative center of the district is the town of Terenozek. Population:

Geography
Lake Arys is located in the district.

References

Districts of Kazakhstan
Kyzylorda Region